Viktor Östlund (born 19 January 1992) is a Swedish handball player for HK Malmö and the Swedish national team.

References

External links

1992 births
Living people
Swedish male handball players
Eskilstuna Guif players
Expatriate handball players
Swedish expatriate sportspeople in Denmark
Handball players from Stockholm